Balawa  is a municipality in the core of Mahottari District of Janakpur Zone in south-eastern Nepal. The municipality is formed by mixing five VDC like Balawa, padaul, banauta, badiya-banchauri, dhamaura. As balawa was a popular VDC among these VDC that's why this municipality is named as Balawa municipality. The municipality have every infrastructure that a municipality should have. There are hospital, bank, market, Illaka police office, business centre, playground, library, hospital for animal, water tank, Bus stop, and lastly the famous college for which balawa is renowned. The municipality have direct road connection with Janakpur. Balawa bazar is quite more developed than other surrounding bazzar. The municipality have 11 ward having representative of each. As of the 2021 consensus conducted by the Nepalese Government, the Balawa Municipality is home to roughly 50,000 residence, of varying caste, creed, and ethnicity.

References

External links
UN map of the municipalities of Mahottari District
Balwa (Balawa) Municipality population consensus

Populated places in Mahottari District